The Miss Perú 1971 pageant was 18th edition of miss perú pageant  held on June 1, 1971. That year, 24 candidates were competing for the national crown. The chosen winner represented Peru at the Miss Universe 1971. The rest of the finalists would enter in different pageants.

Placements

Special Awards
 Best Regional Costume - Lambayeque - Lucy Arrascue
 Miss Photogenic - San Martín - Katty Acker
 Miss Congeniality - Distrito Capital - Magnolia Martínez
 Miss Elegance - Lambayeque - Lucy Arrascue
 Miss Body - Ica - Inés Carbajal

Delegates

Amazonas - Sonia Vivanco
Áncash - Karla Fernandez
Apurímac - Paulina Cornejo
Arequipa - Maria Teresa Arellano
Ayacucho - Maria Luisa Villa
Cajamarca - Cynthia Hernandez
Cuzco - Leonela Mansilla
Distrito Capital - Magnolia Martínez
Europe Perú - Isabel James Rossi
Huancavelica - Rosalinda García
Huánuco - Sabrina Slavich
Ica - Inés Carbajal

Junín - Marilú de Cossío
Lambayeque - Lucy Arrascue
Loreto - Pamela Diaz
Madre de Dios - Maria Sosa
Moquegua - Ana Lucia León
Pasco - Fanny Muller
Piura - Cristina Gutierrez
Puno - Dina Mercedes Costa
San Martín - Katty Acker
Tacna - Maria Rafaela Ruiz
Tumbes - Susanna Grundel
USA Peru - Mariella Fauntleroy

References 

Miss Peru
1971 in Peru
1971 beauty pageants